Liparis condylobulbon, commonly known as the tapered sphinx orchid or 细茎羊耳蒜 (xi jing yang er suan) is a plant in the orchid family. It is an epiphytic or  lithophytic orchid with crowded, glossy green, cylinder-shaped pseudobulbs, each with two linear to lance-shaped leaves and between fifteen and thirty five pale green to cream-coloured flowers with  an orange labellum. This orchid usually grows on trees and rocks in rainforest from Taiwan and Indochina to the south-west Pacific.

Description
Flowering occurs between December and August.

Taxonomy and naming
Liparis condylobulbon was first formally described in 1862 by Heinrich Gustav Reichenbach who published the description in Hamburger Garten- und Blumenzeitung.

Distribution and habitat
The tapered sphinx orchid grows on trees and rocks in rainforest. It is found in Taiwan, Myanmar, Thailand, Vietnam, Borneo, Java, the Lesser Sunda Islands, the Maluku Islands, the Philippines, Sulawesi, Sumatra, New Guinea, the Solomon Islands, Queensland, Australia, Fiji, New Caledonia, Samoa, Vanuatu, the Santa Cruz Islands and the Wallis and Futuna Islands. In Australia, it occurs on the Iron and McIlwraith Ranges.

References 

condylobulbon
Orchids of Queensland
Orchids of Indonesia
Orchids of Myanmar
Orchids of New Caledonia
Orchids of Taiwan
Orchids of Thailand
Orchids of Vanuatu
Orchids of Papua New Guinea
Orchids of Vietnam
Plants described in 1862